Bananas Foster is a dessert made from bananas and vanilla ice cream, with a sauce made from butter, brown sugar, cinnamon, dark rum, and banana liqueur. The butter, sugar and bananas are cooked, and then alcohol is added and ignited. The bananas and sauce are then served over the ice cream. Popular toppings also include whipped cream and different types of nuts (pecans, walnuts, etc.).  The dish is often prepared tableside as a flambé.

History
Bananas Foster is an American dessert that originated in New Orleans made with cooked bananas served in a butter, brown sugar and rum sauce. The caramelized liquor-based sauce is often prepared via flambé. This dessert can be served with vanilla ice cream or as a crêpe filling, but it may also be eaten on its own. Cinnamon and nutmeg may be added as seasoning.

Though many think the dish was created at the restaurant Brennan's in New Orleans, Louisiana, it actually got its start a few years earlier in Owen Brennan's Vieux Carré restaurant. In 1951, Ella Brennan and the restaurant's chef Paul Blangé worked together to modify a dish made by Ella's mother in the Brennan family home. At this time New Orleans was a major hub for the import of bananas from South America. It was named for Richard Foster, the chairman of the New Orleans Crime Commission and a friend of restaurant owner Owen Brennan.

See also

 Cherries jubilee
 Cuisine of New Orleans
 List of American desserts
 List of banana dishes
 Louisiana Creole cuisine

References

Food and drink introduced in 1951
American desserts
Banana dishes
Cuisine of New Orleans
Flambéed foods
Ice cream